The Shipping News is a novel by American author E. Annie Proulx and published by Charles Scribner's Sons in 1993. It won the Pulitzer Prize for Fiction, the U.S. National Book Award, as well as other awards. It was adapted as a film of the same name which was released in 2001.

Plot summary
The story revolves around Quoyle, a newspaper reporter from upstate New York, whose father had emigrated from Newfoundland. Shortly after his parents' joint suicide, Quoyle's unfaithful and abusive wife, Petal Bear, leaves town with a lover and attempts to sell their daughters Bunny and Sunshine to sex traffickers. On her getaway, Petal and her lover are killed in a car accident; the young girls are located by police and returned to Quoyle. With selfish parents, an abusive brother, a cheating wife, and no stable job, Quoyle's life is falling apart. His paternal aunt, Agnis Hamm, convinces him to make a new beginning by returning to their ancestral home in Newfoundland.

There, they move into Agnis's childhood home, an empty and abandoned house on Quoyle's Point. Quoyle finds work as a reporter for the Gammy Bird, the local newspaper in Killick-Claw, a small town. The Gammy Birds editor asks him to cover traffic accidents (reminding him of Petal's fate) and also the shipping news, documenting the arrivals and departures of ships from the local port. His reporting develops as Quoyle's signature column.

Over time, Quoyle learns deep and disturbing secrets about his ancestors that emerge in strange ways. As Quoyle builds his new life in Newfoundland, he is transformed. He creates a rewarding job, makes friends and begins a relationship with a local woman, Wavey Prowse.

Ashley's influence
In her acknowledgments, Proulx states, "And without the inspiration of Clifford W. Ashley's wonderful 1944 work, The Ashley Book of Knots, which I had the good fortune to find at a yard sale for a quarter, this book would have remained just a thread of an idea." Ashley's illustrations and quotes are used as chapter headings throughout the book. Some names in the book are taken from knots, for example "Killick hitch" and coil. Coil also refers to "quoyle," the protagonist's name, a coil of rope only one layer thick, flat, "so that it may be walked on ..." This metaphor sums up Quoyle's relationship with the world around him in the novel's first half. Proulx also adopts a unique writing style using fragments and detailed descriptions.

Awards
Pulitzer Prize for Fiction, 1994
National Book Award for Fiction, 1993
The Irish Times International Fiction Prize, 1993

Critical reception

On November 5, 2019, the BBC News listed The Shipping News on its list of the 100 most inspiring novels.

References

External links

1993 American novels
American novels adapted into films
Charles Scribner's Sons books
National Book Award for Fiction winning works
Novels set in Newfoundland and Labrador
Pulitzer Prize for Fiction-winning works
Works by Annie Proulx